The Hindu Religious and Charitable Endowments Department of the Government of Tamil Nadu manages and controls the temple administration within the state. The Tamil Nadu Hindu Religious and Charitable Endowments Act XXII of 1959 controls 36,425 temples, 56  mutts or religious orders (and 47 temples belonging to mutts), 1,721 specific endowments and 189 trusts.

History 
In 1923, Madras Hindu Religious Endowments Act was passed by Madras Presidency. In 1925, the Government constituted "The Hindu Religious and Charitable Endowments Board" consisting of a President and two to four Commissioners nominated by the Government to function as a statutory body. Subsequently, it was modified and in 1960 it became The Hindu Religious and Charitable Endowments department by Tamil Nadu Hindu Religious and Charitable Endowments Act XXII of 1959 which came into force with effect from 28 April 1960. 

From 1991, religious and spiritual leaders are involved in maintenance and administration of the Hindu Temples and Charitable Endowments. However, the maintenance and administration of the Jain temples are under the administration of Jain religious and spiritual leaders.

The act controls 36,425 temples, 56  mutts or religious orders (and 47 temples belonging to mutts), 1,721 specific endowments and 189 trusts.

Schemes 
Annadhanam Scheme is conducted in 746 Temples and 50 to 300 devotees are provided with mid day meals after Uchikala Pooja. In every year Special Rejuvenation camp for mutt and temple elephants to maintain their balanced physical and mental health. Spiritual and Moral Instruction classes were conducted in 485 temples by scholars. Various welfare schemes for temple employees and Nathaswara artists were also performed by this department. This department publishes an electronic magazine called Thiru Koil at its official website.

Temples 

Below are a few temples maintained by the department.

References 

Tamil Nadu state government departments
Hinduism in Tamil Nadu
1960 establishments in Madras State